Duane Sand (born May 8, 1965) is an American businessman and  politician. He is a graduate of the United States Naval Academy, and was a U.S. Navy officer during the Iraq War. Sand ran for the United States Senate in North Dakota on the Republican ticket in 2000 against incumbent Kent Conrad of the Democratic-Nonpartisan League, and was called for duty after the election in 2001. Upon returning, he ran for North Dakota's lone House seat in 2004 and 2008, but failed both times to defeat incumbent Earl Pomeroy. In August 2011, Sand announced his bid to become the 2012 Republican nominee for the same Senate seat he ran for 11 years prior. He lost the Republican nomination to Representative Rick Berg. Sand previously served as the North and South Dakota Director for Americans for Prosperity, a conservative political advocacy group.

Plane crash
On June 4, 2008, Sand was piloting his personal airplane, a Cessna 172, on a flight from Bismarck, North Dakota to Fargo, North Dakota. At approximately 11:00 a.m. CDT, the plane experienced engine problems, and Sand was forced to land in a corn field near the small town of Nortonville, North Dakota, which is located about twenty-six miles south of Jamestown, North Dakota. According to the North Dakota Highway Patrol, the plane came down in the corn field's soft soil, bounced, flipped forward and landed upside down. Sand was buckled into the pilot's seat, but was out of the aircraft before emergency responders arrived. He was evaluated by medical personnel at the site of the crash and in Edgeley, North Dakota. Reports the following day indicated that Sand received a small cut on his forehead along with several bruises, but was otherwise uninjured in the accident.

Military service
After graduating from the U.S. Naval Academy in 1990, Sand went on to serve as a submarine officer in the United States Navy. He served on three different nuclear submarines, eventually achieving the rank of lieutenant commander. Later, he was deployed to the Persian Gulf in support of the Iraq War.

Now retired from active duty, Sand currently serves as the Commander of the Submarine Veterans of North Dakota and has been attempting to raise money to send veterans to the commissioning of the new nuclear-powered submarine .

Business career
As a businessman, Sand has developed a number of properties - including homes, a hotel, a restaurant and apartment buildings. Currently, he serves as president and CEO of North Star Water and Whitehorse Water, an oilfield water services company, which mostly provide water resources for oilfield frack jobs.

Politics
A former inspector for the Nuclear Regulatory Commission, Sand advocates for nuclear energy and establishing nuclear power facilities in North Dakota.

On April 9, 2018, Sand filed papers to run in the June 12 Republican primary for State House in District 47, which is mostly suburban north Bismarck. Sand lost that primary to incumbent representatives George Keiser and Larry Klemin in a campaign that included accusations of misstatements and smears. Keiser later filed a police report that accused Sand of violating the North Dakota Corrupt Practices Act with an advertisement misstating his opponent's vote. In response, Sand also filed a police report that accused Keiser of also misstating his voting record in political advertising.

See also

 2012 United States Senate election in North Dakota
 2008 United States House of Representatives election in North Dakota
 2004 United States House of Representatives election in North Dakota
 2000 United States Senate election in North Dakota

References

External links
 Duane Sand for Senate official campaign website
 
 

1965 births
Living people
United States Naval Academy alumni
United States Navy captains
North Dakota Republicans
United States Navy personnel of the Iraq War
Survivors of aviation accidents or incidents
Tea Party movement activists
United States Navy reservists